John Bartholomew (25 December 1831 – 29 March 1893) was a Scottish cartographer.

Life
Bartholomew was born in Edinburgh, Scotland. His father, John Bartholomew Sr., started a cartographical establishment in Edinburgh, and he was educated in the work. He was subsequently assistant to the German geographer August Petermann, until in 1856 he took up the management of his father's firm. For this establishment, now known as the Edinburgh Geographical Institute, Bartholomew built up a reputation unsurpassed in Great Britain for the production of the finest cartographical work.

Bartholomew was an in-house cartographer for George Philip. He is best known for the development of colour contouring (or hypsometric tints), the system of representing altitudes on a graduated colour scale, with areas of high altitude in shades of brown and areas of low altitude in shades of green. He first showcased his colour contouring system at the Paris Exhibition of 1878; although it initially met with skepticism, it went on to become standard cartographical practice.

Among his numerous publications, particularly worthy of note is the series of maps of Great Britain reduced from the Ordnance Survey to scales of ½ inch and ¾ inch to 1 mile, with relief shown by contour lines and hypsometric tints. The ½ inch series is among the finest of its kind ever produced.

Upon his retirement in 1888, John Bartholomew was succeeded in the firm by his son John George, who extended the ½-inch series, and applied its principles to many other works. For the last six years of his life Bartholomew was living at 32 Royal Terrace in Edinburgh.

Bartholomew died in London on 29 March 1893. He is buried with his parents in Grange Cemetery in Edinburgh, in the northwest section. His wife Annie McGregor (1836–1872), whom he greatly outlived, is also buried there.

See also
John Bartholomew and Son Ltd.

References

Attribution

External links
Bartholomew: A Scottish Family Heritage - site maintained by the family.
Times World Atlases official website including a History and Heritage section detailing landmark Times atlases
See an 1856 map by John Bartholomew Texas, part of New Mexico &c. / drawn & engraved by J. Bartholomew. hosted by the Portal to Texas History

1831 births
1893 deaths
Scientists from Edinburgh
Scottish cartographers
Burials at the Grange Cemetery
19th-century Scottish businesspeople